Harmony, Illinois may refer to:
Harmony, Jefferson County, Illinois, an unincorporated community in Jefferson County
Harmony, McHenry County, Illinois, an unincorporated community in McHenry County